The Rocky Harbour Formation is a formation cropping out in Newfoundland.  Its depositional setting was deltaic, with sediments showing the influence of tides and waves.

Facies from top to bottom
As reported in 

 Herring Cove
Peperite

 Kings Cove Lighthouse
Purple to pink medium/coarse sandstones with rip-up clasts

 Kings Cove North
Wave-influenced, light grey/green/yellow fissile siltstone (weathering white); laminated; interbedding with fine ssts.

 Monk Bay
Dark grey trough-crossbedded and rippled sandstones; poor sorting, coarse to fine grains.

 Cape Bonavista
Crossbedded coarse pink arkosic sandstones

Type section 
Ford's Harbour (previously  known (or mapped) as Rocky Harbour).

References

Ediacaran Newfoundland and Labrador